Bedroom Boogie is a 2001 album released by the Red Elvises.

Track listing 
Pilot John
Bedroom Boogie
Tell Me Who's Your Daddy
San Antone
Ready to Fly
Sticky Little Girl
I Will Come Back
If I Set You Free
Happy That I'm Straight
Naked Rock Star

All songs written by Zhenya Rock

Personnel 

Zhenya Rock - Guitar, vocals, engineer
Brad Houser - Bass
Avi Sills - Drums
Jay Swanson - Bass
Jay Work - Saxophone
Jeff King - Mastering
Christy A. Moeller-Masel - Layout Design

External links 
 "Bedroom Boogie" on iTunes

2001 albums
Red Elvises albums